This list of museums in the East Riding of Yorkshire, England contains museums which are defined for this context as institutions (including nonprofit organizations, government entities, and private businesses) that collect and care for objects of cultural, artistic, scientific, or historical interest and make their collections or related exhibits available for public viewing. Also included are non-profit art galleries and university art galleries.  Museums that exist only in cyberspace (i.e., virtual museums) are not included.

Museums

Defunct museums
 Beside the Seaside Museum, Bridlington, seeking new location 
 Museum of Army Transport, Beverley
 Old Penny Memories, Bridlington
 Yorkshire Waterways Museum, Goole

See also

References

Real Yorkshire: Museums in Hull and the East Riding of Yorkshire

 
East Riding
Museums